The Spanish fly is an emerald-green beetle in the family Meloidae, Lytta vesicatoria.

Spanish fly may also refer to:
 Cantharidin, a poisonous compound secreted by the Spanish fly, historically used in medication and as an aphrodisiac

Art, entertainment, and media

Film 
 Spanish Fly (1975 film), a British comedy
 Spanish Fly (1985 film), a French film directed by José Bénazéraf
 Spanish Fly (2003 film), an American comedy

Music 
 Spanish Fly (band), an American avant garde jazz trio
 Spanish Fly (album), a 1987 album by Lisa Lisa and Cult Jam
 "Spanish Fly", a guitar instrumental by Van Halen from Van Halen II
 "Spanish Fly", a song by Aventura from The Last
 "Spanish Fly", a song by Finch from Say Hello to Sunshine

Other art, entertainment, and media
 The Spanish Fly (play), a 1913 German comedy by Franz Arnold and Ernst Bach
 "Spanish Fly" (Beavis and Butt-head), an episode of Beavis and Butt-head
 Spanish Fly, a 2007 novel by Will Ferguson

Other uses 
 Spanish fly (professional wrestling), a double-team maneuver

See also 
 "Spanish Flea", a popular 1960s song
 "Spanish Fry", an episode of Futurama